Black Rock is a community in the Canadian province of Nova Scotia, located in  Cumberland County.  It is located approximately 10 kilometres west of Parrsboro.

External links
"Standard Geographical Classification (SGC) 2001", Statistics Canada, listing Black Rock as a "locality"
Black Rock on Destination Nova Scotia

Communities in Cumberland County, Nova Scotia